The London offices of the African National Congress (ANC) were wrecked by an  bomb which exploded against the rear wall at 9 am on 14 March 1982. Windows up to 400 yards away were broken. Caretaker Vernet Mbatha, an ANC voluntary worker, who was sleeping in a flat above the offices, was injured. Significant damage was caused to buildings on White Lion Street and Penton Street, where the office was located. The offices served as the ANC's headquarters in exile since the 1960s.

Anti-apartheid activists blamed the South African government. The decision to bomb the office was made following ANC attacks in South Africa, including a rocket attack on the Voortrekkerhoogte military base in August 1981. It was also to demonstrate South Africa's displeasure with the British government. The property was repaired and was the ANC's base until Nelson Mandela's election as South African president in 1994.

General Johann Coetzee, former head of the Security Branch of the South African Police, and eight other South African policemen, admitted to the attack at an amnesty hearing of the Truth and Reconciliation Commission in Pretoria in September 1998. Coetzee claimed the "symbolic attack" was ordered by the National Party government of the time.

See also
Dulcie September
Apartheid

References

1982 crimes in the United Kingdom
1982 in London
Terrorist incidents in London in the 1980s
Terrorist incidents in the United Kingdom in 1982
March 1982 events in the United Kingdom
State-sponsored terrorism
Apartheid government